Antillanca is a ski resort in the Puyehue National Park in southern Chile. It is on the slope of the Casablanca Volcano. The nearest city is Osorno, 98 kilometers away.

External links 
 Ski resort web site

Ski areas and resorts in Chile
Sports venues in Los Lagos Region